The Burlington Historic District in Burlington, New Jersey, United States, is a historic district bounded by the Delaware River and High, West Broad, Talbot, and Reed streets; it is listed on state and federal registers of historic places. The oldest building in Burlington County and one of the oldest residences in New Jersey, the Revell House, is a contributing property. St. Mary's Episcopal Church, built in 1703 and the oldest church in New Jersey, is also within the district; the new St. Mary's, designed by Richard Upjohn and completed in 1854, has separate status as a National Historic Landmark. This district is adjacent to the city's High Street Historic District.

See also
 List of the oldest buildings in New Jersey
 National Register of Historic Places listings in Burlington County, New Jersey
 Burlington Towne Centre (River Line station)

References

External links
 Tour Burlington 

Burlington, New Jersey
Buildings and structures in Burlington County, New Jersey
National Register of Historic Places in Burlington County, New Jersey
Historic districts in Burlington County, New Jersey